Ozen may refer to:

 Özen, a Turkish surname, including a list of people with the name
 Barbara Lynn Ozen (born 1942), American musician
 Clifton J. Ozen High School, in Beaumont, Texas, U.S.
 Ozen, a fictional character in Made in Abyss
 Özen Dam, in Turkey

See also